Anthrenocerus armstrongi is a species of beetle, native to Australia.  It is within the Anthrenocerus genus, and the family Dermestidae.

References

Dermestidae
Beetles described in 2000